The 2019 Individual Speedway Under 21 World Championship was the 43rd edition of the FIM Individual Under-21 World Championship. It was staged over three rounds, at Lublin, Güstrow and Pardubice. Poland's Bartosz Smektała was the defending champion having won the title in 2018 but it was fellow Pole Maksym Drabik that won the title, to become the third rider in history to win the event twice.

Final series

Classification 
The meeting classification  is according to the points scored during the meeting, with the total points scored by each rider during each meeting credited as World Championship points. The FIM Speedway Under 21 World Champion will be the rider who collects the most World Championship points at the end of the series.

See also 
 2019 Speedway Grand Prix
 2019 Team Speedway Junior World Championship

References 

 
2019
Individual Speedway Junior World Championship